The France–Luxembourg border stretches 73 kilometers (45 miles) in length, to the northeast of France and to the south of Luxembourg.

Description 
It begins in the west at the Belgium-France-Luxembourg tripoint, at the junction of the Belgian municipality of Aubange, the French commune of Mont-Saint-Martin and the Luxembourgish commune of Pétange. This point is located on the Chiers.

It then follows a general easterly direction to the Germany-France-Luxembourg tripoint, at the junction of the German municipality of Perl, the French commune of Apach and the Luxembourgish commune of Schengen. This point is located on the Moselle.

History 

When the province of Trois-Évêchés was created in 1552, a first Franco-Luxembourgish border then became existing: it was located between the north of the arrondissement of Metz and the south of that of Thionville.

The border villages of Hussigny and Rédange were ceded by Luxembourg to Lorraine in 1602.

After the Treaty of the Pyrenees in 1659, despite the changes that occurred in the dynasties of its sovereigns, the territorial surface of Luxembourg experienced no variation until 1795, except for those agreed by Marie-Thérèse and the King of France Louis XV, recounted in the two boundary treaties of 1769 and 1779.

Convention of May 16, 1769 
The convention of May 16, 1769 put an end to the existence of several enclaves in France and Austrian Netherlands (of which Luxembourg was a part at the time), this convention also formed a new boundary line: "The Ruisseau de Frisange will serve as Limits in this part, from the place where it leaves the Territory of Frisange, as far as that where it enters the Territory of Ganderen, and from this point, pulling as far as the Moselle, the Limit will remain as it is now, so that Ganderen, Beyern and all that currently belongs below the said Limit to the Empress Queen, will henceforth belong to France”.

The King ceded to the Empress-Queen, via Article XVIII, his rights, claims and possessions over the villages and places located to the left of the Frisange stream. Her Majesty the Empress Queen for her part renounced, via article XIX, all claims to the seigniories that France has so far claimed to possess as dependencies of Thionville, insofar as they are located to the right of the said Frisange stream and the limit marked by article XVIII.

Convention of November 18, 1779 
The Empress-Queen ceded to the King, in the same province, the villages of Gernelle and Rumelle, together with their belongings, dependencies and annexes (article XXX).

19th century 
The communes of Évrange and Hagen were united by decree of 12 April 1811 in Frisange (at the time in the Department of Forests); then reintegrated into the Moselle, under the treaty of 1814.

Before the Revolution, the village of Manderen, landlocked in Lorraine, belonged to the Austrian Netherlands as a dependent of Luxembourg. Following the conquests of France, this village was classified in the department of Forests (canton of Remich). Occupied by Prussia in 1815, the village was finally ceded by it to France in 1829.

From 1871 to 1918, following the German annexation, the Franco-Luxembourg border was reduced to a line that ran from Mont-Saint-Martin to Hussigny-Godbrange.

21st  century 
The last modification of the course of the border dates from 2007 with the exchange of land with a total area of 87,679m2 between the French municipality of Russange and that of Luxembourg Sanem, west of Esch-sur-Alzette, as part of a brownfields project to reconvert steel wastelands into tertiary and university hubs.

List of municipalities bordering this border 
From west to east:

French communes

Luxembourgish communes

Passages

Railway crossing points 
There are currently four open rail crossings:

Road crossing points 
There are many road crossing points crossing the border, the major one being European route E25 from Strasbourg via Saint-Avold and Metz to Luxembourg city, crossing the border at Zoufftgen.

References

See also 
 The Zoufftgen train collision which occurred on October 11, 2006, exactly at the Franco-Luxembourg border
 List of countries and territories by land borders

Borders of France
Borders of Luxembourg
International borders
European Union internal borders

France–Luxembourg relations